The  (Special Forces), also known as FES (the initials of their motto) and Cuachiqueh/Quachis, is a special forces unit of the Mexican Navy officially established in late 2001. Its motto is "" (Strength, Spirit, Wisdom), they are currently under the naval special command structure of the UNOPES.

These forces are capable of carrying out non-conventional warfare in the air, sea and land, by utilizing all means of infiltration available to develop the most variable operational incursions with the use of military diving techniques, parachuting, vertical descent, urban combat, sniping and use of explosives. The units are well organized, trained and equipped to operate independently in maritime, lake, riverine or terrestrial scenarios; they usually participate in joint-training exercises with the U.S. Navy SEALs teams.

Operations 
Operations undertaken by the Special Forces of the Mexican Navy are classified, as well as casualties and collateral damage. It has played a major active role in the Mexican Drug War, undertaking direct action missions, intelligence gathering, reconnaissance operations, personnel, weapons and facility seizures, law enforcement arrests and kill or capture missions. 

The unit was made famous in the media for being responsible for Operation Black Swan, which saw the final capture of major cartel leader Joaquín "El Chapo" Guzmán, ending a manhunt that began after his second escape from a Mexican federal prison. 

They also participated in the Operation Barcina, which gained media attention due to a leaked video recorded by a civilian which saw operators from the Puma Squadron through a Black Hawk Helicopter making use of a M134 Minigun gunning down a Beltran Leyva Cartel leader Juan Francisco Patrón Sánchez aka. “El H2”.  

In July 2022, they carried out the successful "Operación Leyenda II" in which they captured the notorious drug lord "Rafael Caro Quintero", however during the final stage of the operation, an accident under unclarified circumstances occurred where a Black Hawk helicopter transporting FES operators crashed, ending in 14 people losing their life.   

To fulfill their tasks and practice their attributes the unit's members receive specialized training in the following areas:
Direct Action 
Counter-terrorism
Air and ground logistics
Amphibious warfare
Anti-aircraft warfare
CQB and Intervention tactics 
General naval forces support
Parachuting
Mine warfare
Military intelligence
Special Reconnaissance
Search and rescue
Special operations
Submarine and counter-submarine warfare
Surface warfare
FES are divided into multiple assault squadrons, whose primary tasks consist mainly of Direct-Action and Counter-terrorism operations, some of these squadrons are: 

 Hurón Team
 Viper Team
 Tigrillo Team  
 Puma Team  
 Roble Team (dissolved)

Weaponry
SIG Sauer SIG516
M4 Carbine
FN P90
H&K UMP
PSG-1
M249 Squad Automatic Weapon
M1911A1
Glock 17
Five-seveN

See also
Brigada de Fusileros Paracaidistas
Grupo Aeromóvil de Fuerzas Especiales
Grupo Aeromóvil de Fuerzas Especiales del Alto Mando
Ixtoc-Alfa
Mexican Special Forces
- Joint Task Force 2
- Special Boat Service
- Navy SEALs - NSWDG
- Force Recon
- MARSOC - Critical Skills Operator
- Brazilian Marine Corps - COMANF

References

Special forces of Mexico
Military units and formations established in 2001